Chloantha elbursica is a moth of the family Noctuidae. It is only known from the Alborz mountains in northern Iran.

Xyleninae